Leonard James "Len" Reynolds (19 November 1923 – 14 July 1980) was an Australian politician. Born in Harden, New South Wales, he was educated at state schools before attending the University of Sydney. He undertook military service from 1943 to 1946 and was subsequently a teacher and education lecturer. In 1958, he was selected as the Labor candidate for the seat of Barton, which party leader H. V. Evatt was leaving as it was perceived to be too marginal. Reynolds won the seat and held it until 1966, when he was defeated by Liberal candidate Bill Arthur. Reynolds defeated Arthur in 1969, and held the seat until his retirement in 1975. He died in 1980.

References

Australian Labor Party members of the Parliament of Australia
Members of the Australian House of Representatives for Barton
Members of the Australian House of Representatives
Royal Australian Air Force personnel of World War II
1923 births
1980 deaths
20th-century Australian politicians
Royal Australian Air Force airmen